Tigrinestola is a genus of longhorn beetles of the subfamily Lamiinae, containing the following species:

 Tigrinestola howdeni Chemsak & Linsley, 1966
 Tigrinestola tigrina (Skinner, 1905)

References

Desmiphorini